"Angel in My Eyes" is a song written by Tony Mullins and Blair Daly, and recorded by American country music artist John Michael Montgomery. It was released in September 1997 as the only single from his Greatest Hits compilation album. It peaked at number 4 in the United States, and number 6 in Canada.

Content
The song is about a man who falls in love with a woman that she can comfort him.

Critical reception
Rick Anderson of Allmusic, in a review of a later Montgomery compilation, called the song "unusually complex and soulful". Walter Allread of Country Standard Time was mixed in his review of the Greatest Hits package, saying that Montgomery "aims at touchy-feely lovers, new parents[…] and the thousands who buy anything alluding to winged ones. Montgomery's overly forceful delivery (spitting out "sometimes we fight") reflects a tendency toward inch-deep interpretation".

Music video
The music video was directed by Jim Shea.

Chart positions

Year-end charts

References

[  Allmusic]

1997 songs
John Michael Montgomery songs
1998 singles
Songs written by Blair Daly
Atlantic Records singles
Songs written by Tony Mullins